Halone consolatrix is a moth of the subfamily Arctiinae. It was described by Rudolph Rosenstock in 1899. It is found in Australia.

References

Lithosiini
Moths described in 1899